Lake Sacacanicocha (possibly from Aymara saqaqa volcanic exhalation, -ni a suffix, Quechua  qucha lake) is a lake in the Cusco Region in Peru. It lies in the Canchis Province, Sicuani District.

References 

Lakes of Peru
Lakes of Cusco Region